The Fig-tree Borer Longhorn Beetle, or Fig Tree Borer, (Phryneta spinator) is a species of beetle in the family Cerambycidae. It was described by Johan Christian Fabricius in 1792, originally under the genus Lamia. It has a wide distribution throughout Africa. It feeds on Pyrus communis, Ficus carica, Salix babylonica, Cupressus sempervirens, and Vitis vinifera.

Varietas
 Phryneta spinator var. obscura (Olivier, 1792)
 Phryneta spinator var. ugandae Aurivillius, 1914

References

Phrynetini
Beetles described in 1792